František Řezáč (1 January 1943 – 4 May 1979) was a Czech cyclist. He competed at the 1964 Summer Olympics and the 1968 Summer Olympics.

References

External links
 

1943 births
1979 deaths
Czech male cyclists
Olympic cyclists of Czechoslovakia
Cyclists at the 1964 Summer Olympics
Cyclists at the 1968 Summer Olympics
Sportspeople from Prague